This article details the qualifying phase for wrestling at the 2024 Summer Olympics. The competition at these Games comprises a total of 288 wrestlers coming from different nations; each is permitted to enter a maximum of eighteen (one per weight category).

The qualification period commences at the 2023 World Wrestling Championships, scheduled for late August or early September in Belgrade, Serbia, where five quota places for each of the eighteen weight categories will be awarded to the four medalists (gold, silver, and two bronze) and the champion of a bout between two losers from the bronze-medal matches. At the beginning of the 2024 season, four continental qualification tournaments (Asia, Europe, the Americas, and the joint Africa & Oceania) will distribute a total of 144 spots to the top two finalists of each continent across eighteen weight categories. The remainder of the total quota will be decided at the 2024 World Qualification Tournament, offering three quota places per weight category to the two highest-ranked wrestlers and the champion of a wrestle-off between two bronze medalists.

Quota places are allocated to the respective NOC and not necessarily to the wrestlers in the qualification event.

Timeline

Qualification summary

Men's freestyle

57 kg

65 kg

74 kg

86 kg

97 kg

125 kg

Men's Greco-Roman

60 kg

67 kg

77 kg

87 kg

97 kg

130 kg

Women's freestyle

50 kg

53 kg

57 kg

62 kg

68 kg

76 kg

Notes

References

External links
 

Qualification
Qualification for the 2024 Summer Olympics
2024